Henry Whitehead (22 September 1825 – 5 March 1896) was a Church of England priest and the assistant curate of St Luke's Church in Soho, London, during the 1854 cholera outbreak.

A former believer in the miasma theory of disease, Whitehead worked to disprove false theories, but eventually came to prefer John Snow's idea that cholera spreads through water contaminated by human waste.  Snow's work — and Whitehead's own investigations — convinced Whitehead that the Broad Street pump was the source of the local infections.  Whitehead then joined with Snow in tracking the contamination to a cesspool that leaked into the water table which led to the outbreak's index case.

Whitehead's work with Snow combined demographic study with scientific observation, setting important precedent for the burgeoning science of epidemiology.

Whitehead served in several other London parishes before moving to Brampton, now in Cumbria, in 1874, where he was appointed the local vicar. He was instrumental in instigating a movement to build a new church in Brampton, which culminated in Phillip Webb's St. Martin's Church, the only church design of Webb's ever built and now a Grade I listed building. Whitehead moved on to Newlands in Cumberland in 1884, finally becoming vicar of Lanercost for five years until his death.

References

External links
 "The Broad Street Pump:An Episode in the Cholera Epidemic of 1854", The Reverend H. Whitehead in Macmillan's Magazine, Volume XIII, Nov. 1865 - Apr. 1886, pp. 113–122

1825 births
1896 deaths
British epidemiologists
People from Brampton, Carlisle
19th-century English Anglican priests
Cholera